The 2008 congressional elections in Wyoming was held on November 4, 2008. The election coincided with the 2008 U.S. presidential election, as well as with two United States Senate races.

Wyoming has one seat in the House, apportioned according to the 2000 United States Census. Its 2007–2008 congressional delegation consisted of one Republican. That remains unchanged although CQ Politics had forecasted the district to be at some risk for the incumbent party.

Campaign
The statewide Primary election was held August 19, 2008.

A February 2008 poll showed this race in a dead heat with Democratic nominee Gary Trauner slightly edging Republican nominee Cynthia Lummis 41% to 40%. CQ Politics forecasted the race as 'Leans Republican'. A mid-May poll by Research 2000/Daily Kos showed Trauner leading Lummis 44-41%.  A mid-October poll by the same group showed Trauner leading Lummis 44-43%, with 4% supporting Libertarian W. David Herbert and 9% undecided.

Six-term Barbara Cubin (R), who held the seat at the time of the election, announced her retirement and didn't run for re-election, making this an open seat. She had beaten her Democratic opponent, Teton County School Board Chairman Gary Trauner, by only 1,012 votes in 2006. She sought reelection in a district – coterminous with the state of Wyoming – that gave George W. Bush an overwhelming victory with 69% of the vote in 2004 but whose governor, Dave Freudenthal (D), was reelected with 70% of the vote in 2006. Cubin had been a lightning rod for controversy over a number of incidents that ranged from receiving money from ARMPAC, to distributing penis-shaped cookies to male colleagues while in the Wyoming Legislature, to even an incident after a televised debate in which she remarked that if the Libertarian candidate, Thomas Rankin, who has multiple sclerosis and must use a wheelchair, "weren’t sitting in that chair," she would have slapped him in the face. So few were surprised when Cubin announced that she would retire from Congress as she would have faced both a tough primary and general campaign for an 8th term.

On the Republican side, Cheyenne substitute teacher Swede Nelson was the first to announce his candidacy for the seat on September 8, 2007.  State House Majority Leader Colin M. Simpson, son of former U.S. Sen. Alan Simpson, announced he intended to run early in 2007 but later withdrew from the race. Other Republicans running include conservative former state Treasurer Cynthia Lummis, state Rep. Dan Zwonitzer, businessman and rancher Mark Gordon of Buffalo, and retired naval captain and 2006 candidate Bill Winney who had garnered 40 percent of the vote against Cubin in the 2006 primary. Nelson and Zwonizter withdrew, with Lummis and Gordon remaining in the field. Lummis had the experience and name recognition and Gordon a massive war chest, $647,768 in self-financing as of June 30, 2008, and early television advertising.  After Zwonizter withdrew, Green River physician and Ron Paul backer Mike Holland jumped in the race. Gordon outspent Lummis 4-1 in the primary. After anonymous circulation of two mailings attacking him personally, Gordon became critical of Lummis' campaign and hence aired ads about her past voting record of increasing taxes. Lummis countered with criticism of Gordon's past funding of Democrats Trauner, Governor Dave Freudenthal in 2006, and John F. Kerry for president in 2004. Lummis ultimately won the nomination, 46-37 over Gordon, with Winney obtaining 12 percent and Holland 5 percent.

Moving on from her win in the primary, Lummis faced the Democrat, Trauner.  While Trauner had a tremendous fundraising advantage over Lummis, the race would have likely be decided by who received the most Gordon supporters, and if Trauner gained as much Republican support as he did in 2006.  In addition, since the Libertarian Rankin received over 7,500 votes in 2006, while Cubin's margin of victory was only 1,012 votes, support for Herbert and whether he drew more votes away from Lummis or Trauner could have also played a factor. Trauner's massive war chest from the DNC contributed to his TV ads swamping television across the state, while Lummis had very little money left from her expensive primary battle. Trauner won the key endorsement of Governor Freudenthal, and pushed his ads negatively on Lummis. Lummis countered with her own attack ads, and the National Parties contributed their own attack ads. After a long fight for the open seat, Wyoming voters selected Lummis to succeed Barbara Cubin in Congress.

General election results

See also 
 Wyoming's At-large congressional district

References

External links 
 Elections from the Wyoming Secretary of State
 U.S. Congress candidates for Wyoming at Project Vote Smart
 Wyoming U.S. House Races from 2008 Race Tracker
 Race ranking and details from CQ Politics
 Campaign contributions from OpenSecrets
 Lummis (R) vs Trauner (D) graph of poll results at Pollster.com

United States House of Representatives
Wyoming
2008